The 2017 Colorado Buffaloes football team represented the University of Colorado Boulder during the 2017 NCAA Division I FBS football season. The Buffaloes were led by fifth-year head coach Mike MacIntyre, and played their home games at Folsom Field in Boulder. They competed as members of the South Division of the Pac-12 Conference. They finished the season 5–7, 2–7 in Pac-12 play to finish in last place in the South Division.

Previous season
In 2016, the Buffaloes were a surprise team in the Pac-12, winning the South division for the first time after having finished last in each of the previous five seasons. After losing to Washington in the Pac-12 Championship Game, they were invited to play in the Alamo Bowl, where they lost to Oklahoma State, 8–38. Their final record was 10–4, 8–1 in Pac-12 conference play. Head coach Mike MacIntyre was awarded the AP Coach of the Year Award for his team's turnaround and success.

Schedule
Colorado announced their 2017 football schedule on January 18, 2017. In Pac-12 conference play, they did not play cross-divisional foes Oregon and Stanford.

Source:

Coaching staff

Source:

Game summaries

vs. Colorado State

Sources:

vs. Texas State

Sources:

vs. Northern Colorado

Sources:

vs. Washington

Sources:

at UCLA

Sources:

vs. Arizona

Sources:

at Oregon State

Sources:

at Washington State

Sources:

vs. California

Sources:

at Arizona State

Sources:

vs. USC

Sources:

at Utah

Sources:

Roster

References

Colorado
Colorado Buffaloes football seasons
Colorado Buffaloes football